Stop Spinning is the second EP by the band The U-Men, released in 1985. It was produced and engineered by John Nelson at Crow Studio in Seattle.

Track listing 

 Clubs
 The Fumes
 Cow Rock
 Green Trumpet
 A Year and a Day
 Ten After One

References

1985 EPs
The U-Men albums